Nikabad (also Romanized as Nīkābād; formerly, Yangabad, also Romanized as Yangābād, Jangābād, Yankābād, and Yengābād) is a city in the Jarqavieh Sofla District (Lower Jarqavieh District), in Isfahan County, Isfahan Province, Iran. At the 2006 census, its population was 4,164, in 1,059 families.

Dashte Jahan
Dashte Jahan is the name of the ancient city that was established during the Sasanian Empire period.

Gallery

References

Populated places in Isfahan County

Cities in Isfahan Province